Siratoba is a genus of spiders in the family Uloboridae. It was first described in 1979 by Opell. , it contains 2 species.

References

Uloboridae
Araneomorphae genera
Spiders of the United States
Spiders of Mexico